Pincher Creek is a town in southern Alberta, Canada.

History 
For centuries before European settlers reached this area and inhabited it, Indigenous clans of the Blackfoot, Peigan and Kootenai passed through, lived in or frequented the region.

The town received its name in 1868 when a group of prospectors lost a pincer in the small creek at this location.  These pincers would have been used as a device for trimming the feet of the horses and thus had some value to the group. In 1874, the South-East Mounted Police came to southern Alberta. One of them discovered the rusting tools in the creek, and they named the area Pincher Creek.

Pincher Creek was officially listed as a place name in the Geological Survey Report, 1880.

In 1876, the NWMP established a horse farm in the area. It closed in 1881, but many of the troops stayed to help the town. James Schofield opened Pincher Creek's first store in 1884. By 1885 Pincher Creek had a store known as Schofield & Hyde General Store. Harry Hyde succeeded Schofield as Pincher Creek's first postmaster.

In 1898, Pincher Creek was incorporated a village. In 1906, the community was officially incorporated as a town and named Pincher Creek. Many residents are descendants of the pioneer families who settled there over 100 years ago.

Geography

Climate 
Strong Chinook winds often blow off the mountains and Pincher Creek can be extremely windy. The Oldman River and Castle River valleys seem to act as a kind of funnel for air masses, arguably making the area around Pincher Creek the windiest in Alberta. Any typical day may see wind speeds of 50–90 km/h, the most violent recorded wind being 177 km/h. The strong winds have given rise to a significant amount of wind farm development in the area, with the towers and blades of wind turbines being a characteristic of the scenery. Another consequence of the breezy conditions is that the weather is mostly sunny and very dry as the wind tends to dissipate cloud cover.

The town was severely affected by a flood that hit the area in 1995 as the peak stream flow  discharge of the creek that gave the town its name was 271 cubic meters per second.

On January 10, 1962, a dramatic weather change happened in the area. The temperature in the area rose by 41 °C (74 °F) from -19 °C to 22 °C (-2 °F to 72 °F) in only a few hours.

Demographics 

In the 2016 Census of Population conducted by Statistics Canada, the Town of Pincher Creek recorded a population of 3,642 living in 1,490 of its 1,589 total private dwellings, a  change from its 2011 population of 3,685.

The population of the Town of Pincher Creek according to its 2013 municipal census is 3,619, a 2.5% decrease from its 2008 municipal census population of 3,712.

Attractions 

The Kootenai Brown Pioneer Village is a popular tourist stop open year-round. It was named after Kootenay Brown, who was the founder of Waterton Park. The six-acre site is home to over twenty-three historical buildings, all on open exhibit. Each July, the village has a large Canada Day celebration, as well as hosting other community based events through the year. Among over 18,000 artifacts, historical archives are also located on site and accessible to the public.

Government 
The town's mayor is Don Anderberg.

Media 
Pincher Creek is served by two newspapers, the Sun Media owned Pincher Creek Echo, which publishes on Wednesdays and has been in operation since 1900 and the locally owned Shootin' the Breeze which has been serving the community since 2011. It is also served by an online news website, the Pincher Creek Voice, established in 2011.

Pincher Creek is served by Mountain Radio, a country music station based in nearby Blairmore. Mountain Radio's Pincher Creek transmitter can be heard on 92.7 FM.

Notable people 
White Bird, Nez Perce leader
Dustin Flundra, rodeo cowboy
Matthew Halton, World War II news correspondent
Beverley McLachlin, Hong Kong Court of Appeal judge and former Chief Justice of Canada
Andy Russell, author and conservationist
Gordon Walter Semenoff, theoretical physicist
Darcy Wakaluk, former professional hockey player
Warren Winkler, former Chief Justice of the Ontario Court of Appeal
Darren Varley, murder victim
Charlie Russell, naturalist, artist
Ernest Sands, American politician
Ruth Collins-Nakai, educator, researcher, physician leader, healthcare advisor, and public health advocate
Fred Stinson, writer

See also 
List of communities in Alberta
List of towns in Alberta

Images

References

External links 

1898 establishments in Alberta
Hudson's Bay Company trading posts
Latter-day Saint settlements in Canada
Towns in Alberta